Piratuba is a municipality in the state of Santa Catarina in the South region of Brazil.

It is known as a popular spa town because of its thermal springs.

See also
List of municipalities in Santa Catarina

References

Municipalities in Santa Catarina (state)